is a Japanese manga created by Kaishaku which was first serialized in the Japanese shōnen manga magazine Monthly Dragon Age in May 2006. A 12-episode anime, adapted from the manga, aired in Japan from January 5 to March 23, 2007. The series refers to several of Kaishaku's past works: Kannazuki no Miko, Magical Nyan Nyan Taruto, UFO Ultramaiden Valkyrie and Steel Angel Kurumi.

Plot
Shattered Angels revolves around Kū Shiratori, an apparently-normal high-school girl, who enjoys school life in the large city of Academia. Academia is one of the signs of recovery for humanity ten years after the greatest disaster humankind had ever seen. Kū has a recurring dream in which a prince meets her and takes her away. One day, while her schoolmates are preparing for the upcoming school festival, the prince from her dreams appears. Named Kyoshiro Ayanokoji, his request is the same as in Kū's dreams: "Let's go, together".

Most of the main characters are involved in romantic relationships, and Kū is uncertain of who is in love with whom. The Absolute Angels are superhuman, and to remain so they must draw energy from humans through their lips. The Angels materialize, controlling their mecha from without and using large, mechanized limbs. During a battle, the angels phase into and out of their angelic forms. As in Kannazuki no Miko, the names of the mecha are drawn from artifacts and figures of Japanese and European mythology.

Characters

Kū is a high school girl who feels as though she is drifting through existence and describes herself as "empty". She gives letters to a mysterious prince in her dreams, and talks to him in her thoughts. An introverted girl, she thinks she lacks good qualities and seems easily overwhelmed by situations which differ from her previous experiences and expectations. During the incident ten years before the main story, Cielo is split into four entities: Murakumo, Batraz, Claíomh Solais and Megingjord; Megingjord is also divided in two. Kū is the original body; Valteishia is her soul, which is why Kū feels that she lacks something inside. At the end of the series, her body crumbles and she is reincarnated as a younger version of herself. Before the end of the last episode, she dreams of the four Absolute Angels. After the credits of the last episode, Kyoshiro and Setsuna find her near the European Alps; when she sees Kyoshiro, she remembers her past life. Her personality and characteristics resemble Himeko Kurusugawa in Kannazuki no Miko.

Kyoshiro is identified by Kū as the prince of her dreams when he transfers to her school from Jōtō Academy. Refined and a good equestrian, he plays the violin when deep in thought. The youngest of four children, Kyoshiro supports the Central Student Government and intends to destroy the Absolute Angels in accordance with what he believes were the wishes of his late brother Kazuya. After he falls in love with Kū, he re-evaluates his beliefs about the Absolute Angels and the way he has been treating Setsuna. He admits to her that he loves Kū. Setsuna eventually understands and agrees to his plans after she goes with him to find Ku and say goodbye.

Setsuna (also known as "Setsuna of the Moment of Dreams") is the Absolute Angel Claíomh Solais and fights alongside Kyoshiro. She treasures a ribbon bow with bells, given to her by Kyoshiro and tied to the right side of her headdress. Rarely expressing emotion, she is beautiful and an excellent homemaker, causing Kū to call her a "princess". Setsuna acts only according to Kyoshiro's wishes, habitually asking "Would you prefer that, Kyoshiro?". Jealous of Kyoshiro and Kū's relationship, she represses her feelings to not trouble him. When Kyoshiro admits his love for Kū, however, Setsuna expresses her feelings for the first time. In special three of the anime, Setsuna began copying Kū's actions to please Kyoshiro. Later understanding Ku's feelings, she lets Kyoshiro love her. After cutting her hair, Setsuna accompanies Kyoshiro to find Kū and say goodbye. Her Absolute Angel symbol is on her right arm, the dominant arm of Claíomh Solais.

Mika is the head of the Higashigetsu Fūma Witch Academy, dominating the female students with her aide Kaon. She is jealous and possessive when she sees Himiko providing Kaon with energy, and punishes subordinates who fail her. The third-oldest child in the Ayanokoji family, her right eye is purple and her left orange. Mika was hospitalized with an injury during the "Seven Days of Hot Snow", and she is shown with a bandage on her left eye. She wants Murakamo to love no one but herself and is jealously contemptuous of Himiko, who is much higher in Kaon's affections than she is. Mika's flashbacks to her hospitalization indicate that Kaon reminds her of a nurse who had cared for her. Others she mistreats are her older brother Kazuya (whom she hates because of the events surrounding his "death") and her younger brother Kyoshiro; she considers him "the demon's tail" and Kazuya "the demon". Mika's hatred of Kazuya originated during her early teens, when he deliberately stole a girl she liked to hurt his sister's feelings.
Before her death, she entrusted Himiko (despite her hostility towards her) to rescue Kaon from Kazuya, giving her the key to a device she created based on plans drawn up by her grandfather (Reitarō). The device, a cello capable of creating a harmony to suppress Mana, causes pain to an Absolute Angel or Kazuya.

Kaon (also known as "Kaon of the Lunar Spiral") is the Absolute Angel Murakumo, a reference to Ame no Murakamo in Kannazuki no Miko. A student at the Higashigetsu Fūma Witch Academy, she attacks Kū and her friends as directed by Mika. Himiko usually appears with her, although she initially denies that their relationship is romantic.
She wants to protect Himiko (even at a cost to herself), as Chikane did for Himeko. Kaon has her Absolute Angel mark on her left arm; at one point, Mika replaces Kaon's mark with her own so Kaon can only draw energy from Mika. Kaon's emotional bond with Himiko is interrupted, but her true nature resurfaces and her mark is restored when Himiko kisses her. In special two of the anime Kaon visits Himiko, who draws her nude with a blanket.

Himiko is close to Kaon and subordinate to Mika, saying that the latter "assigned" her name. Reminiscent of Himeko Kurusugawa in Kannazuki no Miko in her lack of self-confidence and emotional bond with Kaon, she develops determination and courage. Although she enjoys creating pictures, the only subject for her drawings and paintings seems to be Kaon.

Sōjirō, the second-oldest child in the Ayanokoji family, is a muscular, heavily-scarred man. Despite Tarlotte's abuse, he is concerned about her well-being and expresses pity for the Absolute Angels. Unlike his siblings, Sōjirō seems peaceful and thoughtful. Jin Ōgami reveals that before his association with Tarlotte, Sōjirō commanded the Morality Enforcement Squad. After Kazuya kidnaps Tarlotte, he enlists the squad to retrieve the Absolute Angels.

Tarlotte (also known as "Tarlotte of the Aligned Planets") is the Absolute Angel Batraz. She is temperamental, with a childish character and body. Frequently inarticulate, when she attacks Ku's school she absorbs the students' energy, including some from Kozue. Tarlotte has a rather odd relationship with Sōjirō; although she enjoys both his food and his cooking, is jealous of him and relies on him to care for her, she nevertheless abuses him. However, when Kazuya kidnaps her Tarlotte wants only to be with Sōjirō: this reveals that Tarlotte does have caring feelings for him-(hinting that all of the times that she was acting violent towards Sojiro was to hide her true feelings: this implies that she has romantic feelings for him). Her Absolute Angel mark is on her right thigh, and her tail is attached to her underwear; despite often being shown in a lot of serious situations she's considered a comic relief character.

Valteishia, calling herself "Valteishia of the Sun and Solitude," commands the Absolute Angel Megingjord and has experienced death and reincarnation three times. She is Kazuya's loyal companion, suppressing Kū's memories of her time with Kyoshiro and stunning Setsuna so he can take her away. When Valteishia explains how the original Absolute Angel Cielo was split into four beings, she says that one of them subdivided into body and spirit; Kū is the angel's body, and Valteishia its spirit. The spirit was channeled into a Steel Angel body by Kazuya, and became Valteishia. She wants to be restored to her "vessel", Kū. Valteishia is adapted from Valkyrie of the anime and manga series UFO Princess Valkyrie.

The oldest Ayanokoji son, later revealed to the main antagonist. The genius Kazuya helped his grandfather with the experiments to create Absolute Angels. Although Kyoshiro thinks that Kazuya had sacrificed himself to avoid the catastrophe from ten years earlier and was presumed dead, Sōjirō considers him a fool as it turns out that Kazuya had faked his death and later returns after being missing for ten years. Kazuya resembles the prince in Kū's dreams because her dreams are memories of her time in the lab being developed by him. Although Kazuya appears soft and gentle, in actuality he's nothing more than a wolf in sheep's clothing on the surface, possessing an evil egomaniacal persona, who behaves and speaks in an overly theatrical manner. Him saving Kyoshiro as a small child was completely unintentional; Kazuya having pushed the young Kyoshiro into an escape pod when in truth he wanted his kid brother out of the way and out of his life. He generally looks down upon his younger siblings, claiming that all the things and accomplishments that they have done in their lives have held no purpose or meaning and frequently preaching they need to be more like him. In the past, he purposely tormented his younger sister Mika by stealing another young girl that Mika was in love with and brutally abuses his siblings.

Jin, leader of the Seventh Public Morality Enforcement Squad, resembles Sōma Ōgami in Kannazuki no Miko but has a less-forthright personality and seems more concerned with Academia than its inhabitants.

Kozue, Kū's best friend and classmate since childhood, who has her energy drained by Tarlotte when the latter attacks their school. Fascinated by Jin Ōgami, she tries to contact Kū after she disappears.

Absolute Angels

Media

Print
The manga, created by Kaishaku, was serialized in the Japanese magazine Monthly Dragon Age (published by Fujimi Shobo) from May 2006 to July 2007. Three tankōbon volumes were released in Japan, the last of which was published on August 9, 2007. A light novel, Kyoshiro and the Eternal Sky -Prelude-, was released in Japan on February 20, 2007.

Internet radio show
Kyoshiro to Towa no Sora had an Internet radio program, which began in the i-revo TE-A room since August 30, 2006. The hosts are Noriko Shitaya (Himiko) and Junji Majima (Jin Ōgami), who hosted  during the run of Kannazuki no Miko. Voice actors included Sayuri Yahagi (Kū) (episodes 5, 6, 11 and 12), Yuki Matsuoka (Setsuna) (episodes 7 and 8) and Hitomi Nabatame (episodes 13 and 14).

Anime
A 12-episode anime television series aired in Japan from January 5 to March 23, 2007. The series, originally licensed by ADV Films, was transferred to Funimation Entertainment (who released the series on February 24, 2009) in July 2008.

Episode list

Reception
Erica Friedman reviewed the anime on her blog, Okazu, saying it is "probably the best thing Kaishaku has ever created" even though it has many plot holes and its setting makes no sense, and praised Kaon and Himiko for having a "happy ending."  She also said that the series comes to a "confusing, but less-unsatisfying than usual, end."

See also
Kannazuki no Miko
Magical Nyan Nyan Taruto
Steel Angel Kurumi
UFO Ultramaiden Valkyrie

References

External links
 Official manga website 
 Official anime website 
 Shattered Angels at Funimation
 

2006 manga
2007 Japanese novels
2007 Japanese television series debuts
2007 Japanese television series endings
Fantasy anime and manga
Films about reincarnation
Fujimi Fantasia Bunko
Fujimi Shobo manga
Kadokawa Dwango franchises
Funimation
Light novels
Mecha anime and manga
LGBT in anime and manga
Romance anime and manga
Shōnen manga
TNK (company)
Yuri (genre) anime and manga
Yuri (genre) light novels
Japanese LGBT-related television shows